The marmoset rat (Hapalomys longicaudatus), also known as the greater marmoset rat, is a species of rodent in the family Muridae. It is found in Malaysia, Myanmar, and Thailand. Its natural habitat is subtropical or tropical dry forests. It is threatened by habitat loss.

References

 Musser, Guy G. 1972. The species of Hapalomys (Rodentia, Muridae). American Museum Novitates no. 2503.

Hapalomys
Rodents of Malaysia
Rodents of Myanmar
Rodents of Thailand
Mammals described in 1859
Taxa named by Edward Blyth
Taxonomy articles created by Polbot